is a passenger railway station located in the city of Tachikawa, Tokyo, Japan, operated by East Japan Railway Company (JR East).

Lines
Nishi-Kunitachi Station is served by the Nambu Line, and is situated 34.3 km from the terminus of the line at Kawasaki Station.

Station layout
The station consists of two elevated opposed side platforms, with an elevated station building above the tracks and platforms. The station is staffed.

Platforms

History
The station opened on 11 December 1929.

Passenger statistics
In fiscal 2019, the station was used by an average of 10,108 passengers daily (boarding passengers only).

Surrounding area
Tachikawa City Civic Center
Tachikawa Children's Future Center
National Civil Service Mutual Aid Association Tachikawa Hospital
Kenseikai Fureai Mutual Hospital
Tokyo Tachikawa Joint Government Building
Tokyo Tachikawa Tax Office

See also
List of railway stations in Japan

References

External links

 JR East Station information 

Stations of East Japan Railway Company
Railway stations in Tokyo
Railway stations in Japan opened in 1929
Nambu Line
Tachikawa, Tokyo